The Lateral Range is a mountain range in the Russian Federation and Georgia, with a very small part in Azerbaijan. The range is part of the Greater Caucasus.

Some swathes of the range are protected areas, under the Kabardino-Balkaria Nature Reserve and the North Ossetia Nature Reserve.

Geology
In its western part the range is composed of Paleozoic and Triassic sedimentary rocks, in its central part of Upper Proterozoic and Paleozoic crystalline schist and granite, and in its eastern part of Jurassic shale.

Geography
The Lateral Range is characterized by alpine landforms. It runs parallel to the northern side of the Main Caucasian Range, to the south of the Skalisty Range, along the Krasnodar Territory, Karachay-Cherkessia, Kabardino-Balkaria, North Ossetia, Ingushetia, Chechnya and Dagestan federal subjects of Russia, as well as the countries of Georgia and Azerbaijan.
The range consists of somewhat detached mountain massifs, separated by the upper reaches of the rivers flowing from the northern slopes of the Greater Caucasus. The Lateral Range extends from the upper course of the Laba River, a left tributary of the Kuban, in the west, to almost the eastern end of the mountain system. It is made up of two parts: The western one is bound by the valley of the Ardon, and the eastern is a prolongation of the Main Caucasian Range, the dividing range of the Caucasus.

On the non rocky slopes of the Lateral Range there are alpine meadows, and in the central part there are several glaciated areas. There are high mountain pastures in the lower parts below the glaciers.

See also
List of highest points of Russian federal subjects
List of mountains and hills of Russia
Skalisty Range, Caucasus

References

External links

Schematic maps of the Caucasus (in Russian)

Mountain ranges of Russia
Mountain ranges of Georgia (country)
Mountain ranges of the Caucasus